Brigitte Obermoser (born 2 July 1976 in Radstadt) is an Austrian former alpine skier who competed in the 1998 Winter Olympics and 2002 Winter Olympics.

External links
 sports-reference.com

1976 births
Living people
Austrian female alpine skiers
Olympic alpine skiers of Austria
Alpine skiers at the 1998 Winter Olympics
Alpine skiers at the 2002 Winter Olympics
People from Radstadt
Sportspeople from Salzburg (state)
20th-century Austrian women
21st-century Austrian women